Dear Edward is an American drama television series developed by Jason Katims, based on the novel of the same name by Ann Napolitano. It premiered on February 3, 2023 on Apple TV+.

Premise
Young Edward Adler is the lone survivor of a plane crash that takes the lives of his family. He and others affected by the tragedy connect with one another to cope with their respective losses and pain.

Cast

Main

 Taylor Schilling as Aunt Lacey
 Colin O'Brien as Edward Adler
 Robin Tunney as Jane Adler
 Anna Uzele as Adriana
 Idris DeBrand as Kojo
 Carter Hudson as John
 Maxwell Jenkins as Jordan
 Amy Forsyth as Linda
 Audrey Corsa as Zoe
 Eva Ariel Binder as Shay
 Brittany S. Hall as Amanda
 Khloe Bruno as Becks
 Connie Britton as Dee Dee
 Jenna Qureshi as Mahira
 Dario Ladani Sanchez as Sam
 Douglas M. Griffin as Milo
 Ivan Shaw as Steve

Recurring
 Brian d'Arcy James as Mr. Adler
 Clara Wong as Daphne

Episodes

Production
It was announced in February 2022 that Apple TV+ had given a ten episode greenlight for the series, which Jason Katims developed from Ann Napolitano's novel. Colin O'Brien was cast in the title role, with Connie Britton and Taylor Schilling also announced to star. Fisher Stevens was set to serve as director for the pilot episode. Additional casting was announced in March 2022 as production began in New York City, with filming taking place at Central Park. In April, Brian d'Arcy James was cast for a recurring role.

Release
Dear Edward was released on February 3, 2023, with the first three episodes available immediately and the rest debuting on a weekly basis.

Reception
The review aggregator website Rotten Tomatoes reported a 55% approval rating with an average rating of 6/10, based on 29 critic reviews. The website's critics consensus reads, "Sincerely acted and occasionally quite moving, Dear Edward nevertheless bears the signature of overdetermined schmaltz that's too intent on wringing tears." Metacritic, which uses a weighted average, assigned a score of 61 out of 100 based on 16 critics, indicating "generally favorable reviews".

References

External links
 

2020s American drama television series
2023 American television series debuts
Apple TV+ original programming
English-language television shows
Television series about orphans
Television series based on American novels
Television shows about aviation accidents or incidents